Nagem (lux.: Nojem) is a village in northwestern Luxembourg.

It is situated in the commune of Redange and has a population of 223.

Gallery

References 

Redange
Villages in Luxembourg